Fedia Damianov (Bulgarian: Федя Дамянов; born August 14, 1950) is a Bulgarian sprint canoer who competed in the early 1970s. At the 1972 Summer Olympics in Munich, he won a bronze medal in the C-2 1000 m event.

Damianov also won two bronze medals at the 1971 ICF Canoe Sprint World Championships in Belgrade, earning them in the C-2 500 m and C-2 1000 m events.

References

External links
 
 Results at Canoeresults.eu

1950 births
Bulgarian male canoeists
Canoeists at the 1972 Summer Olympics
Olympic canoeists of Bulgaria
Olympic bronze medalists for Bulgaria
Living people
Olympic medalists in canoeing
ICF Canoe Sprint World Championships medalists in Canadian

Medalists at the 1972 Summer Olympics